Shea Cowart is an American sprinter. At age six she contracted meningococcemia, which resulted in both of her legs being amputated below the knee. At the 2000 Summer Paralympics, she won a gold medal and broke the world record in the women's T44 class 100 m race, and won another gold in the T44 200 m event.

External links 

Athletes (track and field) at the 2000 Summer Paralympics
Paralympic track and field athletes of the United States
Paralympic gold medalists for the United States
American amputees
Year of birth missing (living people)
Living people
American female sprinters
Medalists at the 2000 Summer Paralympics
Paralympic medalists in athletics (track and field)
21st-century American women